Wales Rally GB was the most recent iteration of the United Kingdom's premier international motor rally, which ran under various names since the first event held in 1932. It was consistently a round of the FIA World Rally Championship (WRC) calendar from the inaugural 1973 season until the rally's final running in 2019, and was also frequently included in the British Rally Championship.

The first rallies in the 1930s were simply known as Royal Automobile Club (RAC) Rallies and did not necessarily require leaving England. In 1951 the club organised the first annual RAC International Rally of Great Britain to tour the island, and until the 53rd event in 1997 this was still commonly known as the RAC Rally. In 1998, amidst a restructuring of the club and its commercial activities, the event lost its RAC identity and became known as the Rally of Great Britain or Rally GB, with title sponsorship from the Government of Wales since 2003.

The last planned Wales Rally GB was cancelled in 2020 due to the COVID-19 pandemic and the Welsh Government withdrew sponsorship support. Attempts were made to replace it with a Rally UK or Rally Northern Ireland, held entirely in Northern Ireland in 2021 and 2022, however no such event has run as of September 2022.

History

Royal Automobile Club Rallies

1930s 
The inaugural event was the 1932 Royal Automobile Club Rally, which was the first major rally of the modern era in Great Britain. Of the 367 crews entered, 341 competitors in unmodified cars started from nine different towns and cities (London, Bath, Norwich, Leamington, Buxton, Harrogate, Liverpool, Newcastle upon Tyne and Edinburgh.)

The Official Programme explained:

Completing the routes held no other competitive element other than following them within the time schedules, which were deliberately made easy by the RAC so that everybody made it to Torquay. However, competitors performed tests at the finish in Torquay, involving slow running, acceleration and braking. There was no official winner declared, although Colonel A. H. Loughborough in a Lanchester 15/18 was recorded as having the fewest penalty points in the decisive tests at the finish.

The following year's RAC Rally followed a similar format, but with Hastings as the chosen finish. Over three hundred competitors entered, and this time Miss Kitty Brunell, driving an AC four-seater sports, was the driver with the fewest penalties. Over the next few years the rallies finished at various towns including Brighton and Blackpool. The rally was run annually until 1939, after which the outbreak of the Second World War forced its suspension.

RAC International Rallies of Great Britain

1950s: Rallies of the Tests 
The first post-war RAC rally was the RAC International Rally of Great Britain 1951 and included an 1800 mile itinerary with tests of speed, hill-climbing and regularity. Although the rally still started from multiple points, the cars were convened at Silverstone racing circuit for a high speed test, and from there followed a common itinerary around Scotland, Wales and England, finishing in Bournemouth. Cars had to be standard production models and sold in quantities greater than 50. Many motor manufacturers wanted to enter teams and pressed the Society of Motor Manufacturers and Traders to approve the event to remove taboo surrounding the event being only for privateers.

The 1953 event was included as the third round of the inaugural European Touring Championship and included nine tests and part of the route was a secret. The tests included acceleration and braking held at Silverstone, night driving at Castle Combe, a night climb of Prescott Hill, a speed test at Goodwood and a new 'garaging' test at Llandrindod Wells which involved driving into a garage and parking, leaving the garage on foot then proceeding to return and reverse out of the garage, all against the clock. An official winner was declared for the first time, Ian Appleyard, driving a Jaguar XK120.

In 1954 and the years that followed, the rally received criticism for being "no more than a navigational treasure hunt" in comparison to the rallies being held in Europe at the time such as the Alpine or Liege-Rome-Liege. These demanded exceptional driving skill, endurance or had itineraries that required a higher speed over their entire route to avoid harsher penalties. No event was held in 1957 due to the Suez Crisis, but by 1958 no foreigner entered the rally at all. This didn't stop the award for best foreign driver being awarded, to Paddy Hopkirk of Northern Ireland.

For 1959, the rally was moved to November in the hope of making the rally more of a driving test in wintry weather, attempting to address concerns that the touring, regularity, road-rally wasn't necessary or worthy anymore.

1960s: Introduction of special stages 
In 1960, organising secretary Jack Kemsley negotiated with the Forestry Commission to use a closed two-mile (3 km) gravel road named Monument Hill in Argyll, Scotland as a speed test. Times were still converted to points for the purposes of the rally competition and were based on an average speed of 40 mph. Swede Eric Carlsson won the rally and was the only driver not to accrue any penalty points at all. His co-driver Stuart Turner is quoted on the Monument Hill stage in the 1987 book RAC Rally by Maurice Hamilton, saying: "there is no doubt that was the point at which the RAC Rally shifted from a traditional "Find Your Way" on the public roads rally to the type of event we know today".

In the following year, 1961, rough gravel forestry roads all over the country were opened up to the drivers and the sealed surfaces such as Oulton Park made a tiny fraction of around 200 miles of special stages. With so many, the results of the rally were based more on what happened on these stages. This, with the introduction of special timing clocks and seeding of entries, secured the rally's future and appeal to international competitors, and the beginning of its reputation as one of the most gruelling and unpredictable fixtures on the calendar.

By 1965 there was over 400 miles across 57 special stages held on a mix of War Department roads, racing circuits and other private venues but the majority were in the forests. In 1966, the Forestry Commission increased the compensation requested for the use of its roads and the rally gained a sponsor in The Sun newspaper to help cover the costs, which were already being assisted by Lombank. From 1965, penalties accrued on the public road sections were being applied in units of time instead of points, with the total time measured on the special stages classifying the results of the rally.

The 1967 event was cancelled on the eve of the event due to the outbreak of foot-and-mouth disease, so competitors staged a mock rally at the Bagshot proving ground as consolation for the press and television (ATV had been persuaded to provide major coverage with in-car cameras for the first time).

1970s: Sponsorship and spectator special stages 
Until 1970 there had been no title sponsorship, but in that year the rally plates on all cars carried advertising of the event's newspaper sponsor after the name (RAC International Rally of Great Britain sponsored by the Daily Mirror). In 1971, the event's full title itself changed to become known as the Daily Mirror RAC International Rally of Great Britain. This deal lasted for two further events before finance company Lombard North Central, then known as Lombank, took over title rights in 1974. The event became known as the Lombard RAC Rally, and Lombard's name became synonymous with the event for almost two decades. In 1972 Unipart were sponsoring all the 72 individual stages.

In 1971, ticketed 'spectator stages' were introduced and by 1975 had become an important part of the event's profile and source of revenue. These stages were usually short stints at stately homes or other public venues, such as Chatsworth House and Sutton Park. They were popular with spectators as they were closer to large population centres than the forests in Wales or Scotland, and organisers saw them help control the growing numbers of spectators crowding the forests.

The first day became devoted to these stages, in 1976 over 350 miles of road sections for just 14 miles of simple stages.  They were often referred to as "Mickey Mouse stages" because of the lack of challenge they offered. Competing driver and columnist Chris Lord used the term and said he understood their purpose, but they were putting drivers off entering. Speaking of itineraries, Roger Clark said he'd rather have longer road sections than have "Mickey Mouse" stages to break them up. Nonetheless, they contributed to the results.

The seventies also saw change in the administration of organisation and authority of the sport. In 1975, the RAC's Competitions Committee was replaced by a Motor Sports Council, which was absorbed by the RAC Motor Sports Association in 1979. The legally independent association was created in December 1977 to organise motorsport events, one of which was the RAC Rally.

1980s 

The 1986 RAC Rally was the last European event for Group B vehicles. These highly tuned turbocharged cars were to be banned as they were deemed too powerful and dangerous, in light of the various accidents in which they were involved. In the end, the Peugeot 205 T16 Evo. 2s of Timo Salonen, Juha Kankkunen and Mikael Sundström took three of the top four places, with only Markku Alén's second position in the Lancia Delta S4 preventing a monopoly of the podium.

There were 83 finishers out of 150 starters in 1986, compared to year of worst attrition in 1981 when only 54 of the 151 starters reached the end. This was in stark contrast to the early years: in 1938, there were only 6 retirements from 237 starters.

1990s 
Until 1989 the event was held without crews performing reconnaissance runs through the route beforehand. From 1990 onwards the format which is now standard in international rallying was adopted.

Rallies of Great Britain 
In 1998, 'RAC' disappeared from both the name of the rally and its organising body (RAC MSA). Earlier that year the Club had begun a lengthy process of restructuring and altering its constitution in order to sell its commercial motoring services operation to Cendant. This sale was ultimately blocked by the state on monopoly concerns, but a sale was made early in 1999 to Lex Group.

It's possible that 'RAC' was dropped by request of the existing title sponsor of the rally Network Q, who offered similar commercial services to both Cendant and Lex Group. It's more likely, though not explicitly proven, that use of RAC branding was sold as part of the motoring services deal.

2000s: New formats 

In 2000, the WRC's commercial rights holder International Sportsworld Communicators was sold to a consortium led by David Richards, who revolutionised the series into a TV and spectator friendly series whilst cutting costs. One of the biggest changes implemented was to condense the rallies into a more compact area rather than touring the country, reducing 'dead air' road sections that provided little value to anybody. This was quickly followed by a reduction of services, ultimately to just one central service park; and the double-running of stages in a 'cloverleaf' format was supposed to provide more value for the organisers, competitors, media production and spectators. Additionally, all WRC rallies followed a format of starting on a Thursday evening or Friday morning, to finishing on a Sunday afternoon.

The 2000 Rally GB could no longer start on a Sunday with a day of 'spectator stages' at the traditional stately homes or venues. Instead, tickets were needed for all special stages for the first time, and all stages were run on gravel 'in the forests', with the exception of a short head-to-head super-special held at a purpose-built spectator arena in Cardiff Docks. The rally started and ended in Cardiff and at no point left South or Mid-Wales, the first time in the event's history it had not covered roads in England or Scotland. 2001 saw just one central service area employed at Felindre, near Swansea, then in 2002 every special stage was run more than once.

After 10 years of sponsorship by Network Q, the Welsh Assembly became the title sponsor in 2003, helping to cement the rally's foothold in Wales.
The 2005 rally included the first indoor super special stage at the Millennium Stadium in Cardiff. The rally was overshadowed by a death on the final day. On stage fifteen, Peugeot driver Markko Märtin crashed heavily into a tree, and while he was unharmed his co-driver Michael Park sustained fatal injuries. It was the first death in the WRC in over a decade. The final two stages were cancelled and Sébastien Loeb, who would have won the event and the championship, voluntarily incurred a two-minute time penalty in order not to win under such circumstances, leaving Petter Solberg to be declared the victor. A memorial for Park was unveiled in Märtin's homeland of Estonia and the damaged tree on the Margam Park stage of the rally where he died bears a plaque in memorial of him.

2010s 
In 2016 an agreement was reached between the MSA and Natural Resources Wales to continue to use Welsh forest stages for three years.

2020s 
Rally GB was one of several World Championship rallies cancelled due to the COVID-19 pandemic in 2020, marking the first time in the history of the series that a round in Britain had not been held. A proposed move to Northern Ireland was scrapped for 2021 after the prospective organisers failed to reach an agreement with local government to host the rally. As a result Rally GB has been replaced by the Ypres Rally on the 2021 calendar.

Character

Title showdowns
For many years the rally has traditionally been the last round of the World Championship, and therefore has staged many famous down-to-the-wire showdowns.

In 1991 the world championship came down-to-the-wire in the British forests, with Lancia driver Juha Kankkunen edging out Toyota's Carlos Sainz after the Spaniard suffered engine issues and went off the road in Kielder Forest and damaged his car.

One year later and Sainz and Kankkunen returned to the RAC along with Frenchman Didier Auriol to fight for the 1992 title. Auriol's challenge would end with engine failure, and Kankkunen's hopes were also dashed when he went off and damaged his steering on the final day of the rally in southern Scotland. Sainz eventually won the rally and with it claimed his second world title.

In 1995, it was estimated that around 2 million fans lined the forests to witness Scotsman Colin McRae win his second consecutive RAC Rally. In the process he beat teammate Carlos Sainz to take his first and only world title in front of thousands of fans at Chester Racecourse.

McRae would have less fortune in future years; despite winning again in 1997, he was pipped to the title by Finn Tommi Mäkinen by just one point. The Scot would come up short again in 2001 when he crashed out of an early lead, gifting the championship to his English rival Richard Burns.

One of the most dramatic showdowns was 1998, when championship leader Tommi Mäkinen crashed out on one of the first day's spectator stages after his Mitsubishi hit a patch of oil, slid and tore a wheel off. This seemingly handed the title to Toyota's Carlos Sainz. However, in a cruel twist of fate Sainz's engine let go just 300 meters from the finish line of the final stage, meaning that Mäkinen claimed the championship title, with Luis Moya famously throwing his helmet through the car's rear window in frustration.

In 2003, a four-way title fight was narrowed down to just two when Burns was forced to withdraw from the event for medical reasons, which would tragically claim his life two years later, and Carlos Sainz crashed out. In the end, Norwegian Petter Solberg would win the rally ahead of Sébastien Loeb, and consequently beat the Frenchman to claim his only world rally title by just one point.

Nordic successes 
Nordic drivers have enjoyed rich pickings in the RAC Rally through the years. Home drivers won the first six runnings of the race from 1953, when an outright winner was first declared. However, in 1960 Erik Carlsson of Sweden drove his Saab 96 to a hat-trick of victories in 1960–1962. Of the nine drivers to have won three or more rallies, five have been Swedes, Finns or Norwegians. The record for most victories is currently five, won by Sébastien Ogier (2013–2016, 2018), who surpassed Finnish Hannu Mikkola (1978–79, 1981–82) and Norwegian Petter Solberg (2002–2005). Though, last time a Nordic driver won Rally GB, was in 2012 (Jari-Matti Latvala).

Title sponsors 
Until 1970 there had been no title sponsorship, but in that year the rally plates on all cars carried advertising of the event's newspaper sponsor after the name (RAC International Rally of Great Britain sponsored by the Daily Mirror). In 1971, the event's full title itself changed to become known as the Daily Mirror RAC International Rally of Great Britain. This deal lasted for two further events before finance company Lombard North Central, then known as Lombank, took over title rights in 1974. The event became known as the Lombard RAC Rally, and Lombard's name became synonymous with the event.

Following Lombard's withdrawal of sponsorship after nineteen years, the rally became known as the Network Q RAC Rally and later, the Network Q Rally of Great Britain. The rally has moved its operational base to Cardiff and competitive stage mileage is concentrated in Wales. With sponsorship from the Welsh Government, the event is now known as the Wales Rally GB.

However, with such an extensive history covering the whole country, there were demands for the "glory days" of the old RAC Rally. In this spirit, two events have recently been established, and cover the same classic stages which are no longer part of the WRC itinerary. The RAC Revival Rally uses modern, but less powerful cars, while the Roger Albert Clark Rally is a historic event using only pre-1972 machinery, and named after the first home winner of the race as a World Championship event.

Past winners

Multiple winners

Footnotes

References

External links

 Wales Rally GB official site
 Rally of Great Britain at eWRC-results
 British Rally Championship official site
 Endurance Rally Association, organisers of the RAC Revival Rally

 
Recurring sporting events established in 1932
World Rally Championship rallies